Scopelarchus is a genus of pearleyes.

Species
There are currently four recognized species in this genus:
 Scopelarchus analis (A. B. Brauer, 1902) (Short fin pearleye)
 Scopelarchus guentheri Alcock, 1896 (Staring pearleye)
 Scopelarchus michaelsarsi Koefoed, 1955 (Bigfin pearleye)
 Scopelarchus stephensi R. K. Johnson, 1974

References

Aulopiformes
Marine fish genera
Taxa named by Alfred William Alcock